"Ponta de Lança Africano (Umbabarauma)" is a song by Jorge Ben Jor from his 1976 album África Brasil. It was later recorded by Ambitious Lovers and Soulfly.  The song is about an African striker, Ben Jor's "Ponta de Lança Africano (Umbabarauma)" became a well known football-related track. It has been described as "[possibly] one of the best songs about sports ever written", and prompted one writer to state that "Jorge Ben should be considered the poet laureate of soccer songwriting".

It was included on David Byrne's 1989 compilation Brazil Classics Beleza Tropical, prompting rotation of a video for the track on VH-1. The original version of the track was used in the documentary film Di/Glauber.

It was released as a single in 1989 by EMI Records, backed with another track from the Beleza Tropical album, Nazaré Pereira's "Maculele".

In 2021, Rolling Stone ranked it number 351 in their updated list of the 500 Greatest Songs of All Time.

Ambitious Lovers version

Ambitious Lovers recorded a cover of the song for their Lust album. A 12-inch single of remixes of the track (listed on the label as simply "Umbabarauma") by Charley Casanova and Goh Hotodain was released by Elektra Records in 1990, which became a dance hit, peaking at no. 10 on the Billboard Dance Music/Club Play Singles chart.

Track listing
"Umbabarauma" (World Beat Club Mix) – 5:08
"Umbabarauma" (Jorge Meets Junior House Dub) – 6:20
"Umbabarauma" (Mix Da Verdade) – 4:27
"Umbabarauma" (Cassanova's Kickin' House Mix) – 6:47
"Umbabarauma" (Lemon Tree Basement Dub) – 7:36

Soulfly version

Heavy metal band Soulfly recorded a cover version of the song, as "Umbabarauma", released as the band's second single in 1998, taken from the debut album Soulfly.

Track listing

Maxi-single

Promo CD

Personnel
Regular Soulfly members
Max Cavalera – vocals, rhythm guitar
Jackson Bandeira – lead guitar
Marcello D. Rapp – bass
Roy "Rata" Moyorga – drums

Additional personnel
Eric Bobo – percussion
Jorge Du Peixe – tambora
Gilmar Bolla Oito – tambora
Produced by Ross Robinson

Charts

References

External links 
 Song Lyrics

Soulfly songs
1976 songs
1989 singles
1990 singles
1998 singles
Songs written by Max Cavalera
EMI Records singles
Elektra Records singles
Roadrunner Records singles
Songs about Africa
Football songs and chants